Sambro may refer to:

 , in Emilia-Romagna, Italy
 Sambro, Nova Scotia, a rural fishing community
 CCGS Sambro, a Canadian Coast Guard motor lifeboat

See also
 Sambor (disambiguation)
 Sambro Creek, Nova Scotia, a community
 Sambro Head, Nova Scotia, a community
 Sambro Island Light, a lighthouse near Halifax, Nova Scotia